"Blunt Blowin" is a promotional single by American rapper Lil Wayne, from his ninth studio album, Tha Carter IV. Upon the release of Tha Carter IV it debuted at number 33 on the US Billboard Hot 100.

It was certified Gold by the RIAA on March 16, 2012, for selling 500,000 digital copies. It has since been certified 2× Platinum by the RIAA.

Charts

Certifications

References

2011 singles
Lil Wayne songs
Songs written by Lil Wayne
Songs about cannabis